Ganesh Singh Thagunna (born 7 December 1968) is a Nepali politician and former Minister of Federal Affairs and General Administration .He is a member of the House of Representatives of the federal parliament of Nepal. Previously, he was also elected to the 2nd constituent assembly in 2013. He is a long time member of CPN UML. He is from Darchula District, where he won both the 2013 and 2017 elections from Darchula 1 (constituency).

Political career
Thagunna started his political career, joining CPN UML in 1990. He served as Darchula district secretary for the party three times. He also became a member of the Mahakali zone coordination committee of the party. Following the formation of Nepal Communist Party (NCP) in 2018, he became the district incharge of Darchula for the party.

In the local level elections of 1997, he was elected the chairperson of Darchula District Development Committee.

In the 2013 elections to the 2nd constituent assembly, he was elected from Darchula constituency under the first-past-the-post system.

In the 2017 parliamentary elections, he again won from Darchula constituency under the first-past-the-post system, defeating his nearest rival, Bikram Singh Dhami of Nepali Congress. He received 28,998 votes to Dhami's 22,233. Following his election, he is also serving as the member of the State Direction Principle, Rules and Responsibility Committee as well as the Women and Social Welfare Committee of parliament. He is also a member of Constitution Implementation and Monitoring Committee, the joint parliamentary committee.

Personal life
Thagunna was born to Kalawati Devi Thagunna and her husband Prem Singh, on 7 December 1968, in Khalanga-1 of Darchula district. He has a graduate degree in Science.

Electoral history 

2017 House of Representatives Election

Darchula 1 (constituency)

2013 Constituent Assembly election

Darchula 1 (constituency)

2008 Nepalese Constituent Assembly election

Darchula 1 (constituency)

References

Living people
1968 births
Nepal MPs 2017–2022
Nepal Communist Party (NCP) politicians
People from Darchula District
Members of the 2nd Nepalese Constituent Assembly
Communist Party of Nepal (Unified Marxist–Leninist) politicians